Peace and Rhythm is the second album led by jazz drummer Idris Muhammad which was recorded for the Prestige label in 1971.

Reception

The Allmusic site awarded the album 3 stars stating "Parts of the second solo album by Prestige Records' house drummer, Idris Muhammad, are an even poppier affair than Black Rhythm Revolution, with a mellow soul-jazz feel replacing the slight Latin tinge of the earlier album... "The Peace and Rhythm Suite" is a side-long suite consisting of two long, spacy compositions that predate the ambient house scene by nearly two decades yet sound entirely of a piece with that style. Long, droning, sustained chords on a variety of wind and reed instruments float above Muhammad's percussion, which ebbs and flows in a free, almost arrhythmic way through most of the piece. Fans of The Orb or Brian Eno will find it an old hat, but for early-'70s jazz, this was downright revolutionary".

Track listing
All compositions by Idris Muhammad except where noted
 "Peace and Rhythm Suite: Peace" – 12:05   
 "Peace and Rhythm Suite: Rhythm" (Clarence Thomas) – 5:55   
 "Brother You Know You're Doing Wrong" (Sakinah Muhammad) – 5:40   
 "Don't Knock My Love" (Brad Shapiro, Wilson Pickett) – 4:45   
 "I'm A Believer" (Sakinah Muhammad) – 5:20  
Recorded at Van Gelder Studio in Englewood Cliffs, New Jersey on September 13 (tracks 3–5) and September 20 (tracks 1 & 2), 1971

Personnel
Idris Muhammad – drums, gong, cowbell, cabasa, autohorn
Virgil Jones – trumpet
Clarence Thomas – tenor saxophone, soprano saxophone, flute, bells, arranger
William Bivens – vibraphone (tracks 1 & 2)
Alan Fontaine, Melvin Sparks – guitar (tracks 3–5)
Kenny Barron – electric piano (tracks 1 & 2)
Ron Carter – bass (tracks 1 & 2)
Jimmy Lewis – electric bass (tracks 3–5)
Buddy Caldwell – congas 
Angel Allende – percussion, timbales (tracks 1 & 2) 
Sakinah Muhammad – vocals (tracks 3 & 5)

Production
 Bob Porter – producer
 Rudy Van Gelder – engineer

References

Idris Muhammad albums
1971 albums
Prestige Records albums
Albums produced by Bob Porter (record producer)
Albums recorded at Van Gelder Studio